The following is a list of radio stations formerly owned by CBS Radio, a division of CBS Corporation, prior to its 2017 acquisition by Entercom (now Audacy, Inc.).

Owned at time of merger with Entercom

Arizona

Phoenix
KMLE (Country)
KALV-FM (CHR)
KOOL-FM (Classic Hits)

California

Los Angeles
KAMP-FM 97.1 (CHR)
KCBS-FM 93.1 (Adult Hits)
KNX 1070 (News)
KROQ-FM 106.7 (Alternative)
KRTH 101.1 (Classic Hits)
KTWV 94.7 (Urban AC)

Palm Springs
KQPS (LGBTQ Talk/Dance)

Temecula
KXFG (Country)

Victor Valley
KRAK (Sports)
KVFG (Classic Hits)

Sacramento
KHTK (sports)
KNCI (Country)
KSFM (CHR-Rhythmic)
KYMX (Adult Contemporary)
KZZO (Hot AC)

San Bernardino
KFRG (Country)

San Diego
KEGY (CHR)
KYXY (AC)

San Francisco
KCBS (News)
KFRC-FM (News)
KITS (Alternative)
KLLC (Hot AC)
KMVQ-FM (CHR)
KZDG (South Asian Program)

Connecticut

Hartford
WRCH (Adult Contemporary)
WTIC (News/Talk)
WTIC-FM (Hot AC)
WZMX (CHR-Rhythmic)

District of Columbia

Washington
WIAD  (Hot AC)
WJFK (Sports)
WJFK-FM (Sports)
WPGC-FM (Urban CHR)

Florida

Miami
WKIS (Country)
WPOW (CHR-Rhythmic)
WQAM (Sports)

Orlando
WOCL (Classic Hits)
WOMX-FM (Hot AC)
WQMP (CHR)

Georgia

Atlanta
WAOK - 1380 - (Urban Talk)
WVEE - 103.3 - (Urban Contemporary)
WZGC - 92.9 - (Sports)

Illinois

Chicago
WBBM - 780 - All News
WBBM-FM - 96.3 - CHR/Top 40
WCFS-FM - 105.9 - All News (simulcast of WBBM-AM)
WJMK - 104.3 - Classic Hits
WSCR - 670 - Sports talk radio
WUSN - 99.5 - Country
WXRT - 93.1 - AAA

Maryland

Annapolis
WLZL - 107.9 - Tropical
WDCH-FM - 99.1 - Business news

Baltimore
WJZ (Sports)
WJZ-FM (Sports)
WLIF (Adult Contemporary)
WWMX (Hot AC)

Massachusetts

Boston
WBMX - 104.1 - (Hot AC)
WBZ - 1030 - (News/Talk)
WBZ-FM - 98.5 - (Sports)
WODS - 103.3 - (CHR)
WZLX - 100.7 - (Classic Rock)

Michigan

Detroit
WDZH - 98.7 - Top 40
WOMC - 104.3 - Classic Hits
WYCD - 99.5 - Country
WXYT-FM - 97.1 - Sports/Talk
WXYT - 1270 - Sports/Talk
WWJ - 950 - News

Minnesota

Minneapolis-Saint Paul
KMNB - 102.9 - Country
KZJK - 104.1 - Jack FM
WCCO - 830 - News/Talk

Missouri

St. Louis
KEZK-FM - 102.5 - Adult Contemporary
KMOX - 1120 - News/Talk
KYKY - 98.1 - HOT AC

Nevada

Las Vegas
KLUC-FM - 98.5 - (CHR)
KMXB- 94.1- (Hot Adult Contemporary)
KXNT - 840 - (News/Talk)
KXQQ-FM - 100.5 - (Rhythmic Hot AC)
KXST - 1140 - (Sports)
KXTE - 107.5 - (Alternative)

New York

New York City
WCBS - 880 - (News)
WCBS-FM - 101.1 - (Classic Hits)
WFAN - 660 - (Sports)
WFAN-FM - 101.9 - (Sports; simulcast of WFAN-AM)
WINS - 1010 - (News)
WNEW-FM - 102.7 - (Hot AC)
WBMP - 92.3 - (CHR)

Ohio

Cleveland
WDOK 102.1 (AC)
WKRK-FM 92.3 (Sports)
WNCX 98.5 (Classic Rock)
WQAL 104.1 (Hot AC)

Pennsylvania

Philadelphia
KYW - 1060 - (News)
WIP-FM - 94.1 - (Sports)
WOGL - 98.1 - (Classic Hits)
WPHT - 1210 -(Talk)
WTDY-FM - 96.5 - (Adult Contemporary)
WXTU - 92.5 - (Country)

Pittsburgh
KDKA - 1020- (News/Talk)
KDKA-FM- 93.7 - (Sports)
WBZZ - 100.7 - (Adult Top 40)
WDSY-FM - 107.9 - (Country)

Texas

Dallas/Ft. Worth
KJKK - 100.3 - (Adult Hits)
KLUV - 98.7 - (Classic Hits/Commercials)
KMVK - 107.5 - (Regional Mexican)
KRLD - 1080 -(News/Talk)
KRLD-FM- 105.3 - (Sports)
KVIL - 103.7 - (Alternative)

Houston
KHMX - 96.5 - (Hot AC)
KIKK - 650 - (Sports)
KILT - 610 - (Sports)
KILT-FM - 100.3 - (Country)
KKHH - 95.7 - (Adult Hits)
KLOL - 101.1 - (Spanish Contemporary)

Washington

Seattle
KJAQ - 96.5 - (Adult Hits)
KMPS-FM - 94.1 - (Country)
KFNQ - 1090 - (Sports)
KZOK-FM - 102.5 - (Classic Rock)

Formerly owned stations

California

Fresno
KFJK
KFPT
KMGV
KMJ
KLBN
KSKS
KWYE
(Note: Sold entire cluster to Peak Broadcasting)

Sacramento
KQJK
(Note: Sold to Clear Channel, now iHeartMedia)

Colorado

Denver
KIMN
KWOF
KXKL-FM
(Note: Sold entire cluster to Wilks Broadcasting)

Florida

Tampa
WHFS
WHFS-FM
WLLD
WQYK-FM
WRBQ-FM
WYUU
(Note: Sold entire cluster to Beasley Broadcast Group)

West Palm Beach
WAXY-FM
WEAT
WMBX
WIRK
WUUB
(Note: WAXY-FM sold to Lincoln Financial Media and moved to the Miami market; WUUB sold to Good Karma Broadcasting; remaining stations sold to Palm Beach Broadcasting)

Maryland

Baltimore
WQSR
(Note: Sold to Clear Channel)

Missouri

Kansas City
KBEQ
KCKC
KFKF
KMXV
(Note: Sold entire cluster to Wilks Broadcasting)

New York

Buffalo
WBLK
WBUF
WECK
WJYE
WYRK
(Note: Sold entire cluster to Regent Communications)

Rochester
WCMF
WPXY
WRMM
WZNE
(Note: Sold entire cluster to Entercom, who in turn divested three stations to Stephens Media Group as required by the FCC)

North Carolina

Charlotte
WBAV
WBCN
WFNZ
WKQC-FM
WNKS
WPEG
WSOC-FM
(Note: Sold entire cluster to Beasley Broadcast Group)

Graham
WSML

Greensboro
WMFR

Winston-Salem
WSJS
(Note: Sold entire cluster to Curtis Media Group.)

Ohio

Cincinnati
WAQZ
WGRR
WKRQ
WUBE-FM
(Note: Sold entire cluster to Entercom Communications, now Audacy, who in turn sold three of those stations to Bonneville International and then Hubbard Broadcasting. WGRR was later swapped to Cumulus Media.)

Oregon

Portland
KINK
KLTH
KXL-FM
KUPL
KUFO
KXJM
(Note: KINK, KXL-FM (formerly KUFO), KUPL and KUFO (formerly KXFD) sold to Alpha Broadcasting; KLTH and KXJM sold to Clear Channel)

Pennsylvania

Philadelphia
WIP
(Note: Sold to Beasley Broadcast Group.)

Tennessee

Memphis
WMC (AM)
WMC-FM
WMFS-FM
(Note: Sold entire cluster to Entercom)

Texas

Austin
KAMX
KJCE
KKMJ-FM
KXBT
(Note: Sold entire cluster to Entercom)

San Antonio
KJXK
KTSA
KTFM
(Note: Sold to BMP Radio)

Washington

Tacoma
KBKS-FM
(Note: Sold to Clear Channel)

References